John Granville (born Scarborough, Trinidad and Tobago) is a retired professional football goalkeeper from Trinidad & Tobago.

Granville was born on the island of Tobago, in Scarborough. In 1978, he played for the Southern California Lazers and was selected to the American Soccer League all-star team. Granville led the league in goalkeeping with a 0.99 goals against average and posted seven clean sheets. In 1979, he played for the Cleveland Cobras, also of the ASL. 

He was a goalkeeper and represented Trinidad and Tobago at international level. Granville was on the Trinidad and Tobago team at the 1975 Pan American Games.

He has been goalkeeping coach at Wycombe Wanderers and Swindon Town.

Honours
Wycombe Wanderers
FA Trophy: 1990–91

References

External links
http://www.millwall-history.co.uk/Millwall-A2Z-EtoL.htm

https://web.archive.org/web/20090510103009/http://www.thisisswindontownfc.co.uk/news/headlines/4347812.Granville_axed_/
http://www.socawarriors.net/mens-senior-team/player-directory.html?view=playerprofile&id=179

1956 births
Living people
Aldershot F.C. players
American Soccer League (1933–1983) players
Association football goalkeepers
Chertsey Town F.C. players
Chesham United F.C. players
Cleveland Cobras players
English Football League players
Expatriate footballers in England
Expatriate soccer players in the United States
Footballers at the 1975 Pan American Games
Hayes F.C. players
Los Angeles Heat players
Millwall F.C. players
Pan American Games competitors for Trinidad and Tobago
Slough Town F.C. players
Southern California Lazers players
Swindon Town F.C. non-playing staff
Trinidad and Tobago expatriate footballers
Trinidad and Tobago expatriate sportspeople in England
Trinidad and Tobago expatriate sportspeople in the United States
Trinidad and Tobago footballers
Trinidad and Tobago international footballers
Western Soccer Alliance players
Wycombe Wanderers F.C. non-playing staff
Wycombe Wanderers F.C. players